Possessed is a 1939 novel by the Polish writer Witold Gombrowicz, published under the pseudonym Zdzisław Niewieski. It is a pastiche of gothic and serial novels in the vein of Horace Walpole and Eugène Sue.

Publication
The novel was serialised in the summer 1939 in two Polish daily newspapers, under the pseudonym Zdzisław Niewieski. Only the first two parts were published before the outbreak of World War II. Witold Gombrowicz never claimed authorship of the work until a few days before his death in 1969. It was first published in book form in 1973 and translated from a French translation into English in 1980 by J. A. Underwood. In 1986, the three final parts of the novel were discovered. The full version was published in 1990 and a new English complete translation by Antonia Lloyd-Jones was published in 2023.

See also
 1939 in literature
 Polish literature

References

1939 novels
Novels first published in serial form
Polish novels
Polish-language novels
Works by Witold Gombrowicz
Novels by Witold Gombrowicz